This list of Brookings Institution scholars contains current or former notable scholars from the Brookings Institution. This list is not exhaustive.
 Henry J. Aaron – The Bruce and Virginia MacLaury Chair Senior Fellow in the Economic Studies; Assistant Secretary for Planning and Evaluation (1978–1979), and chairman of the Social Security Advisory Board (1979).
 Hady Amr – Nonresident Senior Fellow at the Center for Middle East Policy; founding director of the Brookings Doha Center in Qatar.
 Martin Neil Baily – Senior Fellow in Economic Studies; Chair of the President's Council of Economic Advisers (1999–2001), and CEA Member (1994–1996).
 Ben Bernanke – Distinguished Senior Fellow with the Economic Studies; Chair of the Federal Reserve (2006–2014), Chair of the President's Council of Economic Advisers (2005–2006), and Member of the Federal Reserve Board of Governors (2002–2005).
 Charles Berry
 Sandra Black – Nonresident Senior Fellow with the Economic Studies; Member of the President's Council of Economic Advisers (2015–2017).
 Alan Blinder – Visiting Fellow in Economic Studies; Vice Chair of the Federal Reserve (1994–1996), and Member of the President's Council of Economic Advisers (1993–1994).
 Gary Burtless
 Stephen P. Cohen: Emeritus Professor at the University of Illinois at Urbana–Champaign.
 Ivo Daalder
 E.J. Dionne
 Anthony Downs
 Arne Duncan – Nonresident Senior Fellow in Governance Studies; Managing Partner at Emerson Collective, U.S. Secretary of Education (2009–2016).
 Susan Dynarski
 Gregg Easterbrook
 Douglas Elmendorf – Senior Fellow; Director of the Congressional Budget Office (2009–2015).
 Bill Frenzel
 Michael Fullilove
 Jason Furman – Senior Fellow and director of The Hamilton Project; Chair of the President's Council of Economic Advisers (2013–2017); and Deputy Director of the National Economic Council (2009–2013).
 James Goodby
 Carol Graham
 Ben Hammersley
 Constance Horner – Guest Scholar; Director of Presidential Personnel (1991–1993), U.S. Deputy Secretary of Health and Human Services (1989–1991), and Director of the U.S. Office of Personnel Management (1985–1989)
 Rashad Hussain: former U.S. special envoy to the Organisation of the Islamic Cooperation under President Obama.
 Martin S. Indyk – John C. Whitehead Distinguished Fellow in International Diplomacy in the Foreign Policy; U.S. Special Envoy for Middle East Peace (2013–2014), U.S. Ambassador to Israel (1995–1997; 1999–2001), and Assistant Secretary of State for Near Eastern Affairs (1997–1999).
 Donald Kohn – Robert V. Roosa Chair in International Economics and Senior Fellow in the Economic Studies; Vice Chair of the Federal Reserve (2006–2010), and Member of the Federal Reserve Board of Governors (2002–2006).
 Thomas E. Mann
 Michael MccGwire, OBE: Analyst of Cold War Soviet strategy.
 Adele Morris
 Janne E. Nolan
 Michael E. O'Hanlon
 Peter R. Orszag – Nonresident Senior Fellow with the Economic Studies; Director of the President's Office of Management and Budget (2009–2010), and Director of the Congressional Budget Office (2007–2008).
 Kenneth M. Pollack
 Jonathan Rauch
 Diane Ravitch
 Susan Rice – Senior Fellow in Foreign Policy; U.S. Ambassador to the United Nations (2009–2013), and Assistant Secretary of State for African Affairs (1997–2001).
 Alice Rivlin – Senior Fellow for Economic Studies; Vice Chair of the Federal Reserve (1996–1999), Director of the President's Office of Management and Budget (1994–1996), and Director of the Congressional Budget Office (1975–1983).
 Miriam Sapiro – Nonresident Senior Fellow in the Global Economy and Development; U.S. Deputy Trade Representative (2009–2014).
 Isabel Sawhill
 Donna Shalala – Distinguished Fellow in Residence with the Economic Studies  and the Center for Health Policy; U.S. Secretary of Health and Human Services (1993–2001).
 Jeremy Shapiro
 Allen Schick
 P. W. Singer
 Gilbert Y. Steiner
 Constanze Stelzenmüller
 James H. Stock – Nonresident Senior Fellow in Economic Studies; Member of the President's Council of Economic Advisers (2013–2014).
 Shibley Telhami
 Janet Yellen – Distinguished Fellow in Residence with the Economic Studies; U.S. Secretary of the Treasury (since 2021), Chair of the Federal Reserve (2014–2018), Vice Chair of the Federal Reserve (2010–2014), President of the Federal Reserve Bank of San Francisco (2004–2010), Chair of the President's Council of Economic Advisers (1997–1999), and Member of the Federal Reserve Board of Governors (1994–1997).
 Peyton Young

References

Brookings Institution scholars
+